Kathryn "Kathy" O'Rourke Parker is a children's educational television producer and writer, best known for being co-creator of the popular children's show Barney & Friends with Sheryl Leach and Dennis DeShazer. Kathy received her B.S. in Special Education in 1976 and an M.A. in Learning Disabilities in 1979, both from Eastern Michigan University. She taught in the field of special education in Michigan from 1976 to 1981, before moving to the state of Texas. From 1981 to 1987 she worked at DLM, Inc. of Allen, Texas marketing early childhood educational products and materials. Then, in 1987, personal friends Parker and Leach began working together on the idea that would become Barney & Friends.

Television career 

Leach originally envisioned a talking teddy bear character, but that changed due to her young son's fascination with dinosaurs. Leach's father-in-law owned an educational publishing company. He invested financially in initial production of the Barney concept, and also added Dennis DeShazer, an SMU alumnus who worked for him as a video writer and producer. This original creative trio produced a series of home videos called Barney and the Backyard Gang, featuring actress Sandy Duncan, which were sold directly to the public. In 1991, Connecticut Public Television programming executive Larry Rifkin rented a Barney tape for his then 4-year-old daughter, Leora, and promptly called Leach's company, the Lyons Group, to team up and produce 26 original episodes for PBS. Later that year, production began on a new TV show, entitled Barney & Friends. Each episode had a 30-minute run time and consisted of a group of children imagining a teachable moment or scenario, which Barney would address through song, dance, and storytelling. PBS briefly considered canceling the new series in 1992 after only 6 weeks on air, but ratings revealed the new show to be the network's highest rated children's program so it remained on air and in production. The series was produced by Lyrick Studios, which was later bought by HIT Entertainment. 
Kathy Parker went on to serve as co-executive producer of the Barney & Friends TV series. Additionally, Parker served as publisher of Barney Books from 1992 to 1994, and helped develop many Barney toys and games with licensing partners. Kathy's husband, Phil Parker, wrote more than 100 songs for the Barney & Friends TV series, some of which achieved Gold or Platinum sales status. His work was nominated for a Grammy award for Best Children's Album.

Charitable work 

The Parkers have invested their resources in many local North Texas charitable causes that benefit children. The Collin County Children's Advocacy Center named Kathy Parker as recipient of their Hero Of Hope Volunteer Award in 2002. She has served on the advisory board of the National Children's Alliance and National Children's Cancer Society, and was board president of the McKinney Education Foundation from 2011 to 2012.

Current news 

Kathy is in the process of creating a new children's program.

References 

Year of birth missing (living people)
Living people
American television producers
American women television producers
Barney & Friends